The 1970 United States Senate election in Pennsylvania was held on November 3, 1970. Incumbent Republican U.S. Senator Hugh Scott won re-election, defeating Democratic nominee William Sesler.

Democratic primary

Candidates
Frank Mesaros, Orthodox priest from Harrisburg
Norval Reece, civil rights activist and senior aide to the Eugene McCarthy 1968 presidential campaign
William Sesler, State Senator from Erie

General election

Candidates
Frank W. Gaydosh (Constitution)
Herman A. Johnson (Socialist Labor)
Robin Maisel (Socialist Workers)
W. Henry McFarland (American Independent)
William R. Mimms (Consumer)
William Sesler, State Senator from Erie (Democratic)
Hugh Scott, incumbent U.S. Senator (Republican)

Results

See also 
 1970 United States Senate elections

References

Pennsylvania
1970
1970 Pennsylvania elections